James Dempsey may refer to:

James Dempsey (Scottish politician) (1917–1982)
James Shannon Dempsey (1887–1955), Canadian politician in the Legislative Assembly of Ontario
James Dempsey (poker player), English professional gambler
James Dempsey (builder) (1768–1838), Australian pioneer
James Dempsey (hurler) (born 1989), Irish hurler
James C. Dempsey, United States Navy submarine commander